The Pagode du bois de Vincennes is the seat of the  founded by Jean Sainteny who was the manager of the institute. It is located in a former building of the exposition coloniale de 1931, designed by the architect Louis-Hippolyte Boileau. On this 8 000 m² site on the edge of the lac Daumesnil are located two buildings of remarkable architecture. The most important one, the former house of Cameroon, was restored in 1977 and transformed in a pagoda as a place of worship.  The second is the former house of  Togo is slated for restoration by the City of Paris. It will contain a library for texts on the various Buddhist traditions.

The Pagode de Vincennes is used by Buddhist schools of the Parisian region and has no religious leader. The pagoda is a place of common worship; it shelters the biggest Buddha of Europe, covered with gold leaf and measuring, including its seat, more than 9 meters high. The Pagode hosts relics of the historical Buddha since 2008.

A Tibetan buddhist temple named Kagyu-Dzong exists in  front of the Pagode de Vincennes.

Access
The Pagode du bois de Vincennes, is located 40, route de ceinture du Lac-Daumesnil in the 12th arrondissement of Paris.

Gallery

See also

Kagyu-Dzong

Buddhism in France
Buildings and structures in the 12th arrondissement of Paris
World's fair architecture in Paris
Religious buildings and structures in Paris
Paris Colonial Exposition